The FIBA Diamond Ball competition was an official international basketball tournament organised by FIBA, held every Olympic year prior to the Summer Olympics. The first tournament was held in 2000, for men's teams only. In 2004 and 2008, tournaments were held for both men and women.

The competing teams are the host country of that year's Summer Olympics, defending the FIBA Diamond Ball champions, the reigning FIBA World Cup, Summer Olympics, and continental champions, minus the United States men's team. 

The United States women's team did not participate in the 2004 event, although they were the then-reigning world champions. However, they did compete in the 2008 event, as the Americas champions.

The tournament was not held in 2012 and 2016, and the tournament is not on FIBA's schedule for the next Olympic-year calendar, 2020 in Tokyo.

Men's results

Medals summary

Participation Details

Women's results

Medals summary

Participation Details

See also 
 Acropolis Tournament
 Basketball at the Summer Olympics
 FIBA Basketball World Cup
 FIBA Asia Cup
 Adecco Cup
 Marchand Continental Championship Cup
 Belgrade Trophy
 Stanković Cup
 William Jones Cup

References

External links 
FIBA Diamond Ball Men Archive 
FIBA Diamond Ball Women Archive 

Diamond Ball
Recurring sporting events established in 2000